Elaine Mary Wainwright was Richard Maclaurin Goodfellow Professor in Theology at the University of Auckland. She retired at the end of 2014. She is known for her feminist scholarship in Matthew's gospel, and work on gender and healing within the Graeco-Roman world. Some of her recent publications are The Bible in/and Popular Culture: A Creative Encounter (SBL, 2010), Women Healing/Healing Women: the Genderisation of Healing in Early Christianity (Equinox, 2006), and Shall We Look for Another: A Feminist Re-reading of the Matthean Jesus (Orbis, 1998). Wainwright initially studied at the University of Queensland and then obtained a master's degree at Catholic Theological Union in Chicago and a PhD at the École Biblique in Jerusalem.

As Professor Emerita of Auckland University, Elaine Wainwright RSM, is a member of the Institute of the Sisters of Mercy in Australia and Papua New Guinea and was the international coordinator of the Mercy International Reflection Process (MIRP) in 2016.

Selected works

Books 
Wainwright, Elaine M. Habitat, Human, and Holy: An Eco-Rhetorical Reading of the Gospel of Matthew. Sheffield: Sheffield Phoenix Press Limited, 2017.

——— Matthew: An Introduction and Study Guide: The Basileia of the Heavens Is Near at Hand. T & T Clark Study Guides to the New Testament. London: T&T Clark, 2017.

——— Women Healing/Healing Women: The Genderisation of Healing in Early Christianity. London: Taylor & Francis Group, 2014. 

Wainwright, Elaine, Luiz Carlos Susin and Felix Wilfred (eds). Eco-theology. London: SCM, 2009. 

Wainwright, Elaine Mary. Shall We Look for Another? A Feminist Rereading of the Matthean Jesus. The Bible & Liberation. Maryknoll, N.Y.: Orbis Books, 1998.

——— Towards a Feminist Critical Reading of the Gospel According to Matthew. Berlin/Boston: De Gruyter, Inc., 1991.

Articles

References

External links 
Wainwright's staff profile - University of Auckland

Roman Catholic biblical scholars
New Testament scholars
Living people
New Zealand feminists
Academic staff of the University of Auckland
Year of birth missing (living people)
University of Queensland alumni
Female biblical scholars
Christian feminist biblical scholars